In computing deadbeef may refer to:
 DEADBEEF, the hexadecimal representation of the 32-bit number 3735928559, used in Hexspeak and as a magic debug value
DeaDBeeF, an audio player program